Saif Rashid may refer to:

 Saif Rashid (footballer, born 1991), Emirati goalkeeper
 Saif Rashid (footballer, born 1994), Emirati winger